It's the Great Pumpkin, Charlie Brown: Original Soundtrack Recording is a soundtrack album by American jazz pianist Vince Guaraldi. It was originally released on October 12, 2018 in the U.S. by Craft Recordings/Concord. A reissue containing original recordings and alternate takes sourced from the master reels was released on August 26, 2022.

It is the soundtrack to the Halloween-themed television special of the same name that originally aired on October 27, 1966.

Background
Concord Music reported in mid-2018 that a long-awaited soundtrack album allegedly containing original recordings from the television special were going to be released in time for the Halloween season in 2018. At the time, it was believed that studio master tapes licensed from Lee Mendelson Film Productions had been unearthed like those featured on the 2007 release Vince Guaraldi and the Lost Cues from the Charlie Brown Television Specials and its follow-up, Vince Guaraldi and the Lost Cues from the Charlie Brown Television Specials, Volume 2. Upon release in 2018, it was learned that Concord Music did not have access to any master studio recordings; instead, tracks consisted of music culled directly from the existing television soundtrack minus the dialogue track. This resulted in all other elements remaining intact, including intrusive sound effects.

Shortly after producer Lee Mendelson passed away in December 2019, his children began searching through archives for any original music score recordings from the Peanuts television specials. It was during the COVID-19 pandemic lockdown that original monaural analog session reels recorded on October 4, 1966, were discovered. Written on the tape boxes was the working title for the project, "Big Pumpkin Charlie Brown". The recordings themselves included nearly all of the music cues recorded by Guaraldi and music arranger John Scott Trotter as well as several alternate takes. Music cues recorded after the October 4 session ("Snoopy and the Leaf", "Fanfare", "Breathless", "Graveyard Theme (Trick or Treat)" and "Linus and Lucy (third reprise)") remain missing and were ultimately sourced directly from the television soundtrack, this time without intrusive sound effects that marred the 2018 release.

The recordings contained in the original session reels are complete versions prior to being edited or faded prematurely in order to fit the on-screen action of the television special.

Recording sessions
Guaraldi and his trio – double bassist Kelly Bryan and drummer Lee Charlton – were booked at the debut Pacific Jazz Festival on October 7–9, 1966, at the Orange County Fairgrounds. He had travelled to Southern California several days early, for an October 4 recording session for It's the Great Pumpkin, Charlie Brown at Desilu's Gower Street Studio in Hollywood. The session reunited Guaraldi with former sidemen Monty Budwig (double bass) and Colin Bailey (drums), with whom he had recorded the scores for A Charlie Brown Christmas and the unaired A Boy Named Charlie Brown documentary. They were joined by Emmanuel Klein (trumpet), John Gray (guitar) and Ronald Lang (woodwinds), creating a sextet. The sextet was supervised by composer and music arranger John Scott Trotter, who brought a wider, orchestral sound to the increasingly ambitious melodies Guaraldi was composing for the Peanuts television franchise. Trotter's presence helped Guaraldi refine his music scoring technique. As an experienced jazz pianist, Guaraldi had recorded many of the previous Peanuts music cues as he would in a recording studio: as extended takes that were often too lengthy to fit the on-screen action they accompanied. This resulted in much of the music being faded out prematurely as a scene concluded. "That had become undisciplined," Mendelson recalled in 2018. "John was a very, very large man, and he'd stand on this little podium in this big recording studio and direct the musicians. It was kind of fun; I don't know who was paying attention to whom, but it did help organize the music a little better."

In addition to established songs "Linus and Lucy", "Charlie Brown Theme" and "Frieda (With the Naturally Curly Hair)", Guaraldi composed several new cues for the special, including "The Great Pumpkin Waltz" and "Red Baron." He also resurrected a theme that first surfaced in a 1958 recording session with bassist John Mosher and drummer Johnny Markham, dubbed "D Minor-Major Groove." Retitled "Graveyard Theme," its eerie, spooky ambiance allowed it to become the main theme heard through the special.

Guaraldi also strongly encouraged Mendelson to consider making "Linus and Lucy" the official Peanuts theme. The boogie-woogie-infused song had been featured prominently in A Charlie Brown Christmas but did not appear in Charlie Brown's All Stars!. Guaraldi worked to correct that oversight by featuring it throughout the Halloween special. Melendez responded to Guaraldi's suggestion by beginning the special with a lengthy cold open sequence sans dialogue, employing only music and sound effects to convey Linus and Lucy's search for a pumpkin. Guaraldi recorded a fresh version of "Linus and Lucy" for the opening sequence. Lang's flute counterpoint was featured throughout the new version of "Linus and Lucy", resulting in the song ultimately becoming the Peanuts franchise signature melody.

Trotter also contributed two original compositions, "Snoopy and the Leaf" and "Breathless."

British-born Bailey reflected on recording in 2021 shortly before his death, commenting that "it was terrific playing with Vince. He was a wonderful guy and great piano player. He was a good man for asking me to play on those sessions." Bailey admitted, "I had no idea who Charlie Brown was because I didn't grow up in this country. We just did the tunes: I didn't have any music. I might have had a couple of lead sheets, because there might have been a 'stopper', or something to catch. Monty [Budwig] had lead sheets for the changes. But there was no rehearsal, or anything like that; it was just a recording session to us".

Release and critical reception

2018 release
MusicTAP critic D. W. Dunphy was equally underwhelmed, saying, "there is something wrong about the It’s The Great Pumpkin soundtrack. The audio sounds struck directly from the monophonic television program soundtrack," complaining that "the music here is also presented with the sound effects, but not the dialogue. These are some of the puzzling choices. I could have easily accepted either the strictly music-only version (or as much of it as was available) and the full audio version as a sort of audioplay." Dunphy highlighted the fact that in 1978 former Disney parent company Buena Vista released the exact soundtrack as a children’s book and record set on its Charlie Brown Records label. "Craft Recordings had an opportunity to take full advantage of a 78-minute compact disc and have both the full audio version, dialogue included, and the music-only version on the same disc. Instead, we have some odd half-measure here that doesn't quite honor either the television special or Guaraldi’s contributions." Dunphy concluded calling the release "a missed opportunity," saying that children "who not only grew up with the specials but with those book and record sets are now parents (and some, grandparents) themselves...might welcome the greater permanence of either a CD, a digital file version, or a re-released vinyl LP version of the complete, unexpurgated It’s The Great Pumpkin, Charlie Brown."

Bang commented that the individual tracks "feature music only as it's heard in the animated special, with short edits, fades and some very abrupt stops…along with sound effects 'baked in'" which added "clutter" to the songs.

Following criticism, Craft Recordings announced in June 2022 it would release a new version of the soundtrack remastered from newly discovered original master tapes, without sound effects from the television special.

Legacy
Guaraldi historian and author Derrick Bang commented that the music Guaraldi composed for It's the Great Pumpkin, Charlie Brown "emphatically established the Peanuts musical personality," adding that the version of "Linus and Lucy" featured in the cold open sequence was "arguably the best arrangement…that Guaraldi ever laid down, thanks in great part to Ronald Lang's flute counterpoint." (This version was again utilized in the 1969 feature film A Boy Named Charlie Brown.)

Track listing
All tracks are written by Vince Guaraldi, except where noted.

2018 release – Music From the Soundtrack

2022 reissue – Original Soundtrack Recording

 Tracks 3a, 8b, 10, 11, 13, 15 and 16b on 2022 reissue not included in original reels; these recordings were sourced directly from the television soundtrack.

Personnel

Original 1966 personnel
Vince Guaraldi Sextet
Vince Guaraldi – piano, celesta, arranger
Emmanuel Klein – trumpet
John Gray – guitar
Ronald Lang – woodwinds
Monty Budwig – double bass
Colin Bailey – drums

Additional
John Scott Trotter – orchestrator
Robert G. Hartley – arranger

2018 release personnel
Derrick Bang – liner notes
Bill Belmont – producer
Mason Williams – project supervision
Mark Piro – project supervision
Chris Clough – audio supervision
Joe Tarantino – mastering
Carrie Smith – art direction
Sean Winter – design
Ryan Jebavy – editorial
Maureen Bacon – project assistance
Evelyn Mowbray – project assistance

2022 reissue personnel
Derrick Bang – liner notes
Jason Mendelson – producer
Sean Mendelson – producer
Mark Piro – producer
Vinson Hudson – restoration and mastering
Carrie Smith – design
Ryan Jebavy – editorial
Maureen Bacon – project assistance
Chris Clough – project assistance
Jeff Safran – project assistance
Sig Sigworth – project assistance
Mason Williams – project assistance
Michelle Zarr – project assistance
Deluxe Entertainment Services Group – tape transfer

References

1966 soundtrack albums
2018 soundtrack albums
2022 soundtrack albums
Albums arranged by Vince Guaraldi
Vince Guaraldi albums
Vince Guaraldi soundtracks
Cool jazz soundtracks
Mainstream jazz soundtracks
Peanuts music
Television animation soundtracks